Joseph Killgore House was a historic home located at Newport, New Castle County, Delaware. It was built in the second quarter of the 19th century, and was a two-story, three bay, frame dwelling with a gable roof in the saltbox style.  It began as a -story, hall-parlor plan dwelling and later expanded.  It was located next to the Killgore Hall commercial development.  The house was demolished about 2000.

It was added to the National Register of Historic Places in 1993.

References

Houses on the National Register of Historic Places in Delaware
Houses in New Castle County, Delaware
National Register of Historic Places in New Castle County, Delaware